The corrugator supercilii muscle is a small, narrow, pyramidal muscle close to the eye. It arises  from the medial end of the superciliary arch, and inserts into the deep surface of the skin of the eyebrow. It draws the eyebrow downward and medially, producing the vertical wrinkles of the forehead.

Structure 
The corrugator supercilii muscle is located at the medial end of the eyebrow, beneath the frontalis muscle and just above the orbicularis oculi muscle.

It arises from the medial end of the superciliary arch. Its fibers pass upward and laterally, between the palpebral and orbital portions of the orbicularis oculi muscle. It inserts into the deep surface of the skin of the eyebrow, above the middle of the orbital arch.

Relations 
The supratrochlear nerve passes by the corrugator supercilii muscle between it and the frontalis muscle.

Function
The corrugator supercilii muscle draws the eyebrow downward and medially, producing the vertical wrinkles of the forehead. It is the "frowning" muscle, and may be regarded as the principal muscle in the expression of suffering. It also contracts to prevent high sun glare, pulling the eyebrows toward the bridge of the nose, making a roof over the area above the middle corner of the eye and typical forehead furrows.

Clinical significance 
The muscle is sometimes surgically severed or paralysed with botulinum toxin as a preventive treatment for some types of migraine or for aesthetic reasons.

Etymology 
The name corrugator supercilii comes from Latin, and means wrinkler of the eyebrows.

Additional images

References

Muscles of the head and neck